Allison J. Beckford (born 8 May 1979 in Westmoreland) is a Jamaican sprinter competing in the 400 metres. She attended the Manning's School in Savanna-la-Mar, Westmoreland, Jamaica, where she was one of the star athletes coached by Howard Daugharty. She was also academically astute passing several CXC (Caribbean Examination Council) exams and also A-levels exams after completing her upper six forms education. Her personal best of 50.83 was set in 2002. She has also competed in 400 m hurdles.

Beckford was a part of the Jamaican team that won the bronze medal in the 4 x 400 metres relay at the 2003 World Championships in Athletics. She was not selected for the bronze-winning relay team at the 2004 Summer Olympics. She did compete in the 400 metre race, but suffered a severe hamstring injury.

Beckford is a relative  of long jumper James Beckford. She attended Rice University in Houston Texas.

Achievements

External links 

1979 births
Living people
People from Westmoreland Parish
Jamaican female sprinters
Jamaican female hurdlers
Athletes (track and field) at the 1998 Commonwealth Games
Athletes (track and field) at the 2002 Commonwealth Games
Athletes (track and field) at the 1999 Pan American Games
Athletes (track and field) at the 2003 Pan American Games
Athletes (track and field) at the 2004 Summer Olympics
Olympic athletes of Jamaica
Rice University alumni
World Athletics Championships medalists
Pan American Games medalists in athletics (track and field)
Pan American Games silver medalists for Jamaica
Medalists at the 2003 Pan American Games
Commonwealth Games competitors for Jamaica
20th-century Jamaican women
21st-century Jamaican women